Battle of the Field is a folk rock album by the Albion Country Band, recorded in summer 1973 immediately prior to the band's breakup and only released in 1976 following public demand.

The album was produced and engineered by John Wood, and was recorded at Sound Techniques Studio, Chelsea, London and Island Studio, St Peter's Square, London. The album cover was designed by Ian Logan Associates with photographs by Keith Morris, and the original LP sleeve notes were by Rod McShane.

Track listing
All tracks traditional, arranged by Carthy, Harris, Hutchings, Kirkpartrick, Nicol and Swallow except "Albion Sunrise" and "New St. George" composed by Richard Thompson

Side 1
"Albion Sunrise" - 2:54
Morris Medley: "Mouresque" / "London Pride" / "So Selfish Runs The Hare" (song) / "Maid of the Mill" / "Sheriff's Ride" - 7:14
"I Was a Young Man" (Roud 1572) - 4:03
"New St. George" - 2:37
"La Rotta" - 1:37

Side 2
"Gallant Poacher" - 4:26
"Cheshire Rounds" / "The Old Lancashire Hornpipe" - 2:42
"Hangèd I Shall Be" - 6:20
"Reaphook and Sickle" - 2:44
"Battle of the Somme" (instrumental, W. Lawrie) - 1:48

Personnel
Martin Carthy - vocals, acoustic guitar
Sue Harris - vocals, oboe, hammer dulcimer
Ashley Hutchings - vocals, electric bass guitar
John Kirkpatrick - vocals, Anglo-concertina, button accordion, melodeon, electric piano
Simon Nicol  - vocals, electric and acoustic guitars, electric dulcimer, synthesiser
Roger Swallow - drums, percussion

with
Dave Mattacks - percussion on "Reaphook and Sickle"
Martin Nicholls, John Iveson, Colin Sheen and Paul Beer - sackbuts on "Gallant Poacher"

References

External links
 The Albion Country Band's Gallant Poacher at mainlynorfolk.info
 

The Albion Band albums
1976 albums
Albums produced by John Wood (record producer)
Island Records albums